Apocarotenal, or trans-β-apo-8'-carotenal, is a carotenoid found in spinach and citrus fruits. Like other carotenoids, apocarotenal plays a role as a precursor of vitamin A, even though it has 50% less pro-vitamin A activity than β-carotene. The empirical chemical formula for apocarotenal is C30H40O.

Apocarotenal has an orange to orange-red colour and is used in foods, pharmaceuticals and cosmetic products. Depending on the product forms, apocarotenal is used in fat based food (margarine, sauces, salad dressing), beverages, dairy products and sweets.  Its E number is E160e and it is approved for usage as a food additive in the US, EU and Australia and New Zealand.

Possible carcinogenicity
Epidemiological studies have shown that people with high β-carotene intake and high plasma levels of β-carotene have a significantly reduced risk of lung cancer {{Citation needed|date=June 2022}}. However, studies of supplementation with large doses of β-carotene in smokers have shown an increase in cancer risk, possibly because excessive β-carotene results in breakdown products that reduce plasma vitamin A and worsen the lung cell proliferation induced by smoke {{Citation needed|date=June 2022}}. The chief β-carotene breakdown product suspected of this behavior is trans-beta-apo-8'-carotenal (common apocarotenal) {{Citation needed|date=June 2022}}, which has been found in one study to be mutagenic and genotoxic in cell cultures which do not respond to β-carotene itself.

References

External links
Some info on apocarotenal

Food colorings
Apocarotenoids
Cyclohexenes
E-number additives